Paul Willemse (born 13 November 1992) is a South African born rugby union player for French Top 14 side Montpellier. His regular playing position is lock. Although he was born in South Africa, and was part of the Springbok U20 side that won the 2012 IRB Junior World Championship, he has qualified to play senior international rugby for France on residency grounds, and made his debut against Wales in the Six Nations on 1 February 2019.

Club career

Youth
Despite being born in Pretoria, Willemse moved to Tsumeb in Namibia, where he played rugby for Tsumeb Gymnasium and earned a call-up to the Namibian Under-18 Craven Week squad in 2009.

Willemse was then offered a junior contract by the Golden Lions and moved to Krugersdorp in 2010 to complete this schooling at Monument High School. He once again played at the Craven Week tournament, this time in the colours of the Golden Lions.

In 2011, Willemse represented the Golden Lions U19 side in the 2011 Under-19 Provincial Championship. He scored eight tries to finish joint-third on the try-scoring charts and the leading forward try-scorer.

Golden Lions / Lions
In 2012, Willemse made his first class debut, starting the Golden Lions' 23–16 loss to the Leopards in Potchefstroom in the 2012 Vodacom Cup competition. Willemse scored his first try the following week, scoring the Lions' second try in a comfortable 59–29 over near-neighbours Falcons in Johannesburg.

Willemse made two more starts for the Golden Lions in the Vodacom Cup – scoring another try in their match against the Griffons – before being included in the Lions' starting line-up for their 2012 Super Rugby match against the Cheetahs in Bloemfontein, which ended in a 5–26 loss to the Lions. He made one more appearance in the Vodacom Cup before earning a call-up to the South Africa U20 side.

During the latter half of 2012, he was mainly used in the Golden Lions U21 side that played in the 2012 Under-21 Provincial Championship, scoring three tries in 11 appearances. However, he also made his Currie Cup debut, starting their 2012 Currie Cup Premier Division match against the Blue Bulls in Johannesburg.

Blue Bulls / Bulls / UP Tuks
For the start of the 2013 season, Willemse made the short move across the Jukskei River to join Pretoria-based side Blue Bulls. He made two appearances for university side UP Tuks in the 2013 Varsity Cup competition before the Blue Bulls' 2013 Vodacom Cup matches against Griquas and the Pumas.

Willemse got another taste of Super Rugby action, starting in the Bulls' Australian tour matches against the Reds in Brisbane and the Brumbies in Canberra, before making three appearances off the bench upon their return to South African soil.

In July 2013, the Blue Bulls announced that he signed a contract extension until 31 October 2014.

Still eligible to play at Under-21 level, he made four appearances for the Blue Bulls U21 side during the 2013 Under-21 Provincial Championship, but he firmly established himself in the first team, starting ten matches during the 2013 Currie Cup Premier Division. He scored three tries during the competition, two of those coming in their match against Griquas in Kimberley.

Willemse featured prominently for the Bulls during the 2014 Super Rugby season, playing in 15 matches during the season. This season saw him score his first try in Super Rugby, in a 26–21 win against the Cheetahs in Pretoria. He ended the 2014 Super Rugby season on a high note, scoring two tries in a 40–7 victory over the Melbourne Rebels in their final pool match of the season.

Willemse started all 11 of the Blue Bulls' matches in the 2014 Currie Cup Premier Division as they reached the semi-final of the competition before being eliminated by Western Province in Cape Town.

Grenoble
In June 2014, it was announced that Willemse would join French Top 14 side Grenoble after the 2014 Currie Cup Premier Division competition.

Montpellier

Willemse joined French Top 14 side Montpellier in June 2015.

International career

South Africa U20
Willemse was named in the South Africa Under-20 team that won the 2012 IRB Junior World Championship held in South Africa. Despite Willemse scoring a try for South Africa in their first match of the tournament, he could not prevent his side losing 23–19 to Ireland. He repeated his try-scoring feat in their next match against Italy in a 52–3 victory and he played the entire match as South Africa beat England 28–15 in their final pool match to ensure qualification to the semi-finals.

Willemse started in both the semi-final against Argentina, a comprehensive 35–3 victory, and the final against New Zealand, where he helped South Africa to a 22–16 victory to ensure they lifted the trophy for the first time.

France
In May 2018, Bernard Laporte declared that Willemse could be selected for the French national team due to his three years of residence on French territory as well as his request for a French passport. However, he returned on his position in October 2018 saying that he could not be called until he obtained his passport. On 30 November 2018, he announced that he had obtained French nationality. On 9 January 2019, he was summoned to the French team group to prepare for the 2019 Six Nations.

Willemse was only a reservist in Jacques Brunel's list to prepare for the 2019 Rugby World Cup in Japan. However, he quickly forfeited, and was replaced by Romain Taofifénua.

International tries

Honours

Montpellier
 Top 14: 2021-22
 European Rugby Challenge Cup: 2015–2016

France
 Six Nations Championship: 2022

References

External links
France profile at FFR
Profile, itsrugby.co.uk 
Profile, irb.com

Living people
1992 births
Alumni of Monument High School
Rugby union players from Pretoria
French rugby union players
France international rugby union players
South African rugby union players
South Africa Under-20 international rugby union players
South African emigrants to France
Golden Lions players
Lions (United Rugby Championship) players
Bulls (rugby union) players
Blue Bulls players
Afrikaner people
Rugby union locks
FC Grenoble players
Montpellier Hérault Rugby players
South African expatriate rugby union players
South African expatriate sportspeople in France
Expatriate rugby union players in France